Danilov is a town and the administrative center of Danilovsky District in Yaroslavl Oblast, Russia. Population:

History
Danilov was first mentioned in a chronicle in 1592 and was granted town status in 1777.

Administrative and municipal status
Within the framework of administrative divisions, Danilov serves as the administrative center of Danilovsky District. As an administrative division, it is incorporated within Danilovsky District as the town of district significance of Danilov. As a municipal division, the town of district significance of Danilov is incorporated within Danilovsky Municipal District as Danilov Urban Settlement.

Economy
There is a cheese producing plant and some other industries.

Transportation

The town stands on the M8 Highway. There is also a major railway station where locomotives are switched from electrification system DC 3 kV to AC 25 kV and vice versa. Railway lines go to Yaroslavl, Vologda, and Buy.

References

Notes

Sources

External links
Official website of Danilov 
Danilov Business Directory 

Cities and towns in Yaroslavl Oblast
Danilovsky Uyezd